Berenjaq is a village in Tirchai Rural District, Kandovan District, Meyaneh County, East Azerbaijan Province, Iran. At the 2006 census, its population was 16, in 6 families.

References 

Populated places in Meyaneh County